The Autostrada A33 is an Italian motorway intended to connect Asti to Cuneo. It is currently under construction, however construction works have been paused since 2012, with no date set to recommence construction for the completion of the remains 9.5 kilometres.

References

Buildings and structures completed in 2005
Autostrade in Italy
Transport in Piedmont